This is a list of Sheriffs and High Sheriffs of Suffolk.

The Sheriff is the oldest secular office under the Crown and is appointed annually (in March) by the Crown. The Sheriff was originally the principal law enforcement officer in the county and presided at the Assizes and other important county meetings. Most of the responsibilities associated with the post have been transferred elsewhere or are now defunct, so that its functions are now largely ceremonial. There was a single Sheriff serving the two counties of Norfolk and Suffolk until 1576.

On 1 April 1974, under the provisions of the Local Government Act 1972, the title of Sheriff of Suffolk was retitled High Sheriff of Suffolk.

Sheriff

Pre-17th century

17th century

18th century

19th century

20th century

High Sheriff

20th century

21st century

See also
High Sheriff of Norfolk and Suffolk

References
 British History Online-List of Sheriffs for Suffolk

 
Suffolk
Local government in Suffolk
History of Suffolk
Suffolk-related lists